The Yellow Peril is a racist color-metaphor that represents East Asian peoples as an existential danger to the Western world.

Yellow Peril may also refer to:

Books
Yellow Peril (novel), a 1991 Chinese language novel by Wang Lixiong that was published in English as China Tidal Wave
The Yellow Peril: Dr Fu Manchu & The Rise of Chinaphobia, a 2014 book by Sir Christopher Frayling
The Dragon, 1913 novel by M. P. Shiel, serialized as The Yellow Peril in 1929

Film and television
"The Yellow Peril", an episode of the BBC sit-com Only Fools and Horses

Internet
 Yellow Peril, a blog by New Zealand commentator Tze Ming Mok
 Yellow Peril, a webcomic by Jamie Noguchi

Music
Le Péril Jaune, a 1983 album by French band Indochine

Nicknames and slang terms
 Handley Page Type D and Handley Page Type E, monoplanes referred to as the Yellow Peril
 N3N Canary, an aircraft
 Stearman N2S, a trainer aircraft
 Vault (sculpture), a sculpture in Melbourne, Australia, popularly known as The Yellow Peril

See also 
 Yellow Pearl (disambiguation)